is one of syllable in Javanese script that represent the sound /lɔ/, /la/. It is transliterated to Latin as "la", and sometimes in Indonesian orthography as "lo".

Pasangan 
Its pasangan form , is located on the bottom side of the previous syllable. For example,  - anak loro (two kids).

The pasangan has two forms, the other is used when the pasangan is followed by 'ꦸ', 'ꦹ', 'ꦿ', 'ꦽ', or 'ꦾ'. For example,  - anak lurah (the child of a lurah)

Murda 
The letter ꦭ doesn't have a murda form.

Glyphs

Unicode block 

Javanese script was added to the Unicode Standard in October, 2009 with the release of version 5.2.

References

Javanese script